The Turin International was a world's fair held in Turin in 1911 titled Esposizione internazionale dell'industria e del lavoro. It received 7,409,145 visits and covered 247 acres.

Summary

The fair opened on 29 April, was held just nine years after an earlier Turin fair which had focused on the decorative arts, and at the same time as another Italian fair in Rome, also with an arts focus. This fair deliberately distinguished itself by focusing on industry and labour.

The fair was held in the Parco del Valentino (as were the three previous Turin fairs in 1884, 1885 and 1902 and the subsequent 1924 Turin fair).

Participants

Participating countries were Argentina, Austria, Belgium, Bolivia, Brazil, Bulgaria, Chile, China, Colombia, Denmark, Ecuador, France, Germany, Greece, Hungary, Italy, Japan, Mexico, Netherlands, Nicaragua, Peru, Russia, Serbia, Siam, Spain, Switzerland, Turkey, United Kingdom, United States and Uruguay.

National pavilions
The Art Nouveau Hungarian pavilion was designed by Emil Töry, Maurice Pogány and Dénes Györgyi;
the Brazilian pavilion incorporated paintings by Arthur Timótheo da Costa;
the Siamese pavilion was designed by Mario Tamagno and Annibale Rigotti and had a multi-colored roof with a gold dome and the Ottoman pavilion was designed by Léon Gurekian.

See also

 Images from over 200 pages from the official guide to the fair 
 Material about this exhibition is stored at the Science Museum in London

Further reading

 Giacomo Domini; Exhibitions, patents, and innovation in the early twentieth century: evidence from the Turin 1911 International Exhibition, European Review of Economic History.
Site dedicated to documenting the exhibition

References

World's fairs in Turin
1911 in Italy
Arts in Italy
1911 festivals
20th century in Turin
Art Nouveau exhibitions